The 2007 Northern Ireland Trophy was a professional ranking snooker tournament that took place between 4–11 November 2007 at the Waterfront Hall in Belfast, Northern Ireland.

Stephen Maguire won his first ranking tournament since 2004 by defeating Fergal O'Brien 9–5 in the final. This was Maguire's third ranking title.

In his third round match Ronnie O'Sullivan completed a maximum break against Ali Carter, one of five centuries that he compiled in his 5–2 victory. O'Sullivan remains the only player to make five centuries in a best of 9 match.

Prize fund
The breakdown of prize money for this year is shown below:  

Winner: £30,000
Runner-up: £15,000
Semi-final: £7,500
Quarter-final: £5,600
Last 16: £4,000
Last 32: £2,500
Last 48: £1,625
Last 64: £1,100

Stage one highest break: £500
Stage two highest break: £2,000
Stage one maximum break: £1,000
Stage two maximum break: £20,000
Total: £200,000

Main draw

Final

Qualifying
Qualifying for the tournament took place at Pontin's in Prestatyn, Wales  between 23 October and 25 October 2007.

Century breaks

Qualifying stage centuries

136  Alfie Burden
135  Barry Pinches
134  Rory McLeod
130  Robin Hull
129  Jimmy Michie
118  Mike Dunn
113  Patrick Wallace
113  John Parrott

110, 100  Kurt Maflin
110  Robert Milkins
109, 100  Liang Wenbo
107  Ben Woollaston
104  Jamie O'Neill
103  Liu Song
100  Xiao Guodong

Televised stage centuries

147, 129, 122, 110, 108, 107  Ronnie O'Sullivan
142, 114  Fergal O'Brien
136  Ian McCulloch
136  Ali Carter
135, 106, 105  Stephen Maguire
130, 127  Ding Junhui
127  Stephen Hendry
124, 113  Shaun Murphy
114  Marco Fu

113, 108, 100  Mark Allen
112  Ken Doherty
112  Barry Hawkins
110  Neil Robertson
108, 102  Stephen Lee
108  Joe Perry
106  Nigel Bond
102  Adrian Gunnell
101  Ryan Day

References

2007
Northern Ireland Trophy
Trophy
Northern Ireland Trophy